Henry Wadsworth Longfellow is a bronze statue, by William Couper, and Thomas Ball. The statue depicts American poet Henry Wadsworth Longfellow. It is located at the intersection of M Street and Connecticut Avenue, N.W. Washington, D.C. and was dedicated on May 7, 1909.

After the death of Henry Wadsworth Longfellow in 1882, there were several plans to memorialize him. His bust was placed at Poets' Corner in Westminster Abbey in 1884 and a statue of the poet by Franklin Simmons was unveiled in his native town of Portland, Maine at what became known as Longfellow Square. For the statue in Washington, an association was founded to raise money for the effort, ultimately earning $21,000 by subscribers. Additionally, Congress offered another $4,000 and the site. Members of the organization included Andrew Carnegie, Henry Cabot Lodge, Charles William Eliot, Edward Everett Hale, Julia Ward Howe, and Curtis Guild. Theodore Roosevelt served as Honorary Regent. It was unveiled in 1909 by the poet's granddaughter Erica Thorp in the presence of Chief Justice Melville Fuller and the United States Marine Band.

See also
 List of public art in Washington, D.C., Ward 2
 Henry Wadsworth Longfellow Monument in Portland, Maine

References

External links
 
 Henry Wadsworth Longfellow Memorial, dcMemorials.com

1909 establishments in Washington, D.C.
1909 sculptures
Artworks in the collection of the National Park Service
Bronze sculptures in Washington, D.C.
Dupont Circle
Henry Wadsworth Longfellow
Monuments and memorials in Washington, D.C.
Monuments and memorials on the National Register of Historic Places in Washington, D.C.
Outdoor sculptures in Washington, D.C.
Sculptures of men in Washington, D.C.
Statues of writers